The Missionary Methodist Church is a Methodist denomination in the holiness movement.

The foundation of the Missionary Methodist Church is part of the history of Methodism in the United States. In 1913, a schism occurred in the Wesleyan Methodist Church over the issues of tithing, women's ordination, and the wearing of jewelry. Leading the formation of the Missionary Methodist Church in Forest City, North Carolina was  H. C. Sisk (1866-1945).

The Missionary Methodist connexion, which has fourteen churches, holds an annual camp meeting.

References

Further reading

External links 
Missionary Methodist Church

Methodist denominations in North America
Holiness denominations
Holiness movement
History of Methodism in the United States
Christian organizations established in 1913
1913 establishments in the United States